Ten 33 was an American Christian hardcore band, who primarily played a hardcore punk style of music. They came from Richmond, Virginia. The band started making music in 2002 and disbanded in 2006. The band released, a studio album, Emergency! Emergency!, in 2003, with Blood and Ink Records. Their subsequent album, Nightmare on Grace St., was released from Blood and Ink Records, in 2005.

Background
Ten 33 was from Richmond, Virginia. Their members were vocalist, Stephen Poore, guitarists, Joey Russo, Billy Mutter and Matt Wentz, bassist, Zach Wentz, saxophone player, Sweet Lou and drummer and drum machine player, Zach Nelson. They formed in February 2002 and disbanded in July 2006.

Music history
The band commenced as a musical entity in February 2002, with their first release, Emergency! Emergency!, a studio album, and it released in 2003, with Blood and Ink Records. Their subsequent studio album, Nightmare on Grace St., was released on June 28, 2005, by Blood and Ink Records. This would be their final release, as they disbanded in July 2006.

Members
Past members
 Stephe Poore - vocals
 Joey Russo - guitar
 Matt Wentz - guitar
 Zach Wentz - bass
 Zach Nelson - drums
 Billy Mutter - Guitar
 William P. Scruthers - Maintenance

Discography
Studio albums
 Emergency! Emergency! (2003, Blood and Ink)
 Nightmare on Grace Street (June 28, 2005, Blood and Ink)
 Sinking Ships (Single) (2018, Self-Released)

References

External links
 Facebook profile
 Blood and Ink Records

Musical groups from Virginia
2002 establishments in Virginia
2006 disestablishments in Virginia
Musical groups established in 2002
Musical groups disestablished in 2006
Blood and Ink Records artists